Revdanda Fort (in Portuguese "Fortaleza de Chaul") is located in Revdanda, Maharashtra, India.

The fort is located at the mouth of the Kundalika River. It is easily accessible by road. The Alibag-Murud road passes through the fort. Earlier the fort was guarded on three sides by creek water. The main entrance is from the southern side.

History
This fort was built by Portuguese Capt. Soj, and completed in 1524. It was in the control of Portuguese till 1806 when it was captured by Marathas. Finally it was captured by British in 1818.

References 

Forts in Raigad district
Buildings and structures completed in 1524
Portuguese forts in India
16th-century forts in India